Wow & Flutter is an indie rock trio from Portland, Oregon. Formed in 1997 by Cord Amato, the current line-up consists of Cord, Jack Houston and Ryan Matheson.

Wow & Flutter was one of several performers featured on the 2003's For Jonathan, a 2003 effort with indie filmmaker Chris Bennett. Other notable compilations the band has been involved with include 2000's Mute, and 2004's Preserve.

Discography
Guilty Pleasures, released on [Amplified Recordings] (1998)
Pounding the Pavement, released on Jealous Butcher (2000)
Better Today Then, released on Jealous Butcher (2001)
In a Dark Room, released on Jealous Butcher (2001)
Names, released on Jealous Butcher (2002)
Golden Touch, released on Jealous Butcher (2008)
Equilibrio!, released on Mt. Fiji (2010)

External links
Archived version of official website 

Musical groups from Portland, Oregon
1997 establishments in Oregon
Musical groups established in 1997